Eucithara funebris is a small sea snail, a marine gastropod mollusc in the family Mangeliidae.

Description

The shell has a smooth appearance. The ribs are rather solid, obtuse, with wider interspaces. The color of the shell is yellowish brown, broad banded with chestnut. The ribs are lighter colored than the interstices.

Distribution
This marine species occurs off the Philippines.

References

  Reeve, L.A. 1846. Monograph of the genus Mangelia. pls 1-8 in Reeve, L.A. (ed). Conchologia Iconica. London : L. Reeve & Co. Vol. 3.

External links
  Tucker, J.K. 2004 Catalog of recent and fossil turrids (Mollusca: Gastropoda). Zootaxa 682:1-1295.

funebris
Gastropods described in 1846